St. Paul Airport may refer to:

 St. Paul Aerodrome in St. Paul, Alberta, Canada (IATA: ZSP)
 St. Paul Downtown Airport in Saint Paul, Minnesota, United States (IATA: STP)
 St. Paul Island Airport on St. Paul Island, Alaska, United States (IATA: SNP)
 Minneapolis-Saint Paul International Airport in Minneapolis-Saint Paul, Minnesota, United States (IATA: MSP)
 Ohrid "St. Paul the Apostle" Airport in Ohrid, Republic of Macedonia (IATA: OHD)